The Fault in Our Stars is a 2014 American coming-of-age romance film directed by Josh Boone, based on John Green's 2012 novel of the same name. The film stars Shailene Woodley and Ansel Elgort, with Laura Dern, Sam Trammell, Nat Wolff, and Willem Dafoe in supporting roles. Woodley plays a sixteen-year-old cancer patient forced by her parents to attend a support group, where she meets and subsequently falls in love with another cancer patient, played by Elgort.

Development began in January 2012 when Fox 2000, a division of 20th Century Fox, optioned the rights to adapt the novel into a feature film. Principal photography began on August 26, 2013, in Pittsburgh, Pennsylvania, with a few additional days in Amsterdam, The Netherlands, before concluding on October 16, 2013. Pittsburgh doubled for all of the scenes set in Indianapolis, Indiana, the novel's setting, as well as for some interior scenes set in Amsterdam.

The Fault in Our Stars had its world premiere at Seattle International Film Festival on May 16, 2014, and was released in North America on June 6, 2014, by 20th Century Fox. The film received generally positive reviews from critics, with praise given to Woodley's and Elgort's performances and chemistry together, as well as the screenplay. The film was number one at the box office during its opening weekend and grossed $307million worldwide against a budget of $12million. It was released on Blu-ray and DVD on September 16, 2014, and earned $42million in total domestic video sales.

Plot
Indianapolis teenager Hazel Grace Lancaster is living with thyroid cancer that has spread to her lungs. Believing she is depressed, her mother urges her to attend a weekly cancer patient support group. There, Hazel meets Augustus "Gus" Waters who is at the support group for his friend Isaac, who has eye cancer. Gus lost a leg to bone cancer but has since gone into remission. Hazel and Gus bond over  their hobbies and agree to read each other's favorite books. Gus gives Hazel The Prince of Dawn, while Hazel recommends An Imperial Affliction, a novel about a cancer-stricken girl named Anna that parallels Hazel's own experience, but has an abrupt ending. Its author, Peter Van Houten, retreated to Amsterdam following the novel's publication and has not been heard from since.

Weeks later, Gus tells Hazel he has tracked down Van Houten's assistant, Lidewij, and has been corresponding with Van Houten via email. Van Houten says he is only willing to answer their questions in person. Gus then surprises Hazel with tickets to Amsterdam, acquired from a charity organization that fulfills the wishes of children with critical illnesses. After a medical setback, Hazel's doctors eventually allow the trip.

Hazel and Gus arrive in Amsterdam, where Gus confesses his love for Hazel during a romantic meal sponsored by Van Houten. The following afternoon, they go to Van Houten's house, but are shocked to discover he is a mean-spirited alcoholic. It is revealed that the emails from Van Houten had actually come from Lidewij, who arranged the meeting without Van Houten's knowledge. Van Houten taunts Hazel for seeking serious answers to a piece of fiction and belittles her medical condition. Distraught, the teens leave the residence, but Lidewij follows after them and invites them to go sightseeing to compensate for their ruined experience. The three of them visit the Anne Frank House, where Hazel and Gus share their first kiss. The next day, after Gus and Hazel have breakfast with Hazel's mother, Frannie, and they both go for a walk before sitting down on a public bench, Gus reveals to Hazel that his cancer has returned, is spreading throughout his body, and is now terminal.

After their return to Indianapolis, Gus' health continues to deteriorate. Gus invites Hazel and Isaac to his "pre-funeral" so that they can both deliver their prepared eulogies, during which, Hazel tells Gus she would not trade their short time together for anything. Gus dies eight days later. At his funeral, Van Houten appears behind Hazel and reveals that Gus had demanded he do so. After the funeral service, Hazel tells her parents that she wants some alone time and to go for a drive. Not having left yet, while still in her car, Hazel is frightened when Van Houten abruptly enters the car from the passenger side. Van Houten then apologizes for his behavior when she and Gus were in Amsterdam, and explains to her that An Imperial Affliction was inspired by his own daughter, Anna, who died from leukemia at a young age. He gives Hazel a piece of paper, which she initially crumples up and discards in the car, but later retrieves it after Isaac visits her at her house and reveals that the paper was a letter from Gus, who had asked Van Houten for assistance in writing a eulogy for Hazel.

Hazel reads the letter, in which Gus accepts his fate and professes his love for Hazel. As Hazel finishes the letter, she lies on her back on the lawn in her backyard and looks up at the stars, smiling.

Cast

 Shailene Woodley as Hazel Grace Lancaster
 Lily Kenna as young Hazel
 Ansel Elgort as Augustus "Gus" Waters
 Nat Wolff as Isaac, Augustus' best friend
 Laura Dern as Frannie Lancaster, Hazel's mother
 Sam Trammell as Michael Lancaster, Hazel's father
 Willem Dafoe as Peter Van Houten
 Lotte Verbeek as Lidewij Vliegenthart, Van Houten's assistant
 Mike Birbiglia as Patrick, the support group leader
 Ana Dela Cruz as Dr. Maria
 Milica Govich as Mrs. Waters, Augustus's mother
 David Whalen as Mr. Waters, Augustus's father
 Emily Peachey as Monica
 Emily Bach as Monica's Mom
 Carole Weyers as the voice of Anne Frank

Production

Pre-production
On January 31, 2012, it was announced that Fox 2000, a division of 20th Century Fox, had optioned the rights to adapt John Green's novel The Fault in Our Stars for a feature film. Wyck Godfrey and Marty Bowen were due to produce the film with their production company, Temple Hill Entertainment. Stephen Chbosky, who directed The Perks of Being a Wallflower (also filmed in Pittsburgh), was in talks to direct the film but turned it down because of its similarity to Perks. On February 19, 2013, Josh Boone was hired as director; Scott Neustadter and Michael H. Weber were hired to adapt the novel into a screenplaytheir second adaptation for Fox, following Rosaline.

Casting
On March 19, 2013, Entertainment Weekly announced that Shailene Woodley would play Hazel Grace Lancaster. Director Josh Boone said, "We read close to 150 actresses for the role, and I saw about 50 of those. Within ten or fifteen seconds of Shailene's audition, I knew she was Hazel. She held up her script pages and just her eyes were peeking over them." On May 10, 2013, Ansel Elgort was cast as Hazel's love interest, Augustus Waters. On July 23, Laura Dern was cast as Hazel's mother Frannie Lancaster, and Nat Wolff as Isaac, Augustus' best friend. Wolff told HuffPost Live, "It's exciting, I feel really lucky. The fact that I get to work with these super talented peopleI mean, that's part of the reason why, I'm good in the movie, that's the reason." On August 14, Sam Trammell was cast as Hazel's father Michael Lancaster, and on August 28, author John Green announced that Mike Birbiglia would be playing Patrick. On September 6, he tweeted that Willem Dafoe would play Peter van Houten.

Prior to these announcements, author John Green had tweeted that he would be happy if Mae Whitman played Hazel, and in February 2013, there had been speculation that Shailene Woodley and Hailee Steinfeld were among those being considered for the lead role.

John Green filmed a cameo appearance; his scene was cut from the film but is included in the deleted scenes section of the film's DVD and Blu-ray releases. In the cut scene, Green plays the father of a young girl who asks about Hazel's cannula while at the airport. Green said, "They cut [the scene] because it was totally unnecessary to the movie-slash-I was terrible."

Filming
Principal photography began on August 26, 2013, in Pittsburgh, Pennsylvania. Film locations included Oakmont, Pennsylvania, UPMC Children's Hospital of Pittsburgh, and the historic The Mansions on Fifth hotel. The church scenes were filmed at St. Paul's Episcopal Church in the Pittsburgh suburb of Mt. Lebanon. Filming in Pennsylvania continued until October 10; then the production moved to Amsterdam, where filming began on October 14. Filming was officially completed on October 16, 2013.

In Amsterdam, three days of filming took place. Woodley and Elgort were filmed on a canal-side public bench. On July 2, 2014, The Guardian reported that the bench had gone missing, and city officials said they did not know where it was. Amsterdam city spokesman, Stephan van der Hoek said, "It's a bit embarrassing, because we do keep good track of them, but it's gone all right". He promised to install a new bench within weeks. Just a week later, Entertainment Weekly said the Amsterdam film office had tweeted a photograph taken during the re-installation of the stolen bench; Amsterdam film commissioner Simon Brester said it was the same bench, not a replacement.

Filming in Pittsburgh included the interior scenes at the Anne Frank House, which was recreated on a soundstage at Pittsburgh Studios located in Churchill, Pennsylvania, in the east suburbs of Pittsburgh. Production designer Molly Hughes and art director Greg Weimerskirch built three different studio sets in Pittsburgh, one for each floor. Also, the Funky Bones art monument in Indianapolis was recreated in Pittsburgh with the help of the sculpture's creator, Dutch artist Joep van Lieshout.

Author John Green, though an Indianapolis native, was pleased with the selection of Pittsburgh for filming. He commented that Pittsburgh has an amazing community of really talented film professionals that's been built up over the last 20 years. I've been blown away by their professionalism, their confidence, their dedication. There aren't a lot of cities like that. You kind of have to find the city that can be Indianapolis. And Pittsburgh, even though it has a lot of hills, it can be Indianapolis. We just have to find a couple of flat streets.

Music

Mike Mogis and Nathaniel Walcott of Bright Eyes scored the film. The full album track list was released on April 13, 2014, featuring songs from artists including: M83, Grouplove, Kodaline, Jake Bugg, Tom Odell, Birdy, Ed Sheeran and Charli XCX, who performed "Boom Clap", one of the main songs from the movie, which became an international success, due in part to its exposure in the film. The soundtrack was released by Atlantic Records on May 19 in the U.S., and on June 23 in the UK.

Release
The Fault in Our Stars premiered to 300 guests at the Ziegfeld Theater in New York City on June 2, 2014. At the premiere, Green said: "I didn't want to sell it, because Hollywood sucks at making unsentimental movies about illness." The film was released on June 6, 2014.

After the New York premiere, Evangeline Earl, a student, announced that Green's book, from which the film was adapted, had been inspired by her sister Esther Earl, who had also been an author. Esther had thyroid cancer and died in 2010. Evangeline said Esther had met Green at LeakyCon, a Harry Potter convention held in Boston in 2009. Green said, "I could never have written The Fault in Our Stars without knowing Esther. Every word on that book depends on her." Green said he used the word "okay" in the book and the film because Hazel and Augustus used it to express their love for each other.

Marketing
The first trailer was released on January 29, 2014. The trailer had over 3million views in less than 24 hours, and more than 15million views in its first seven days. A video clip was shown before the show at the 2014 MTV Movie Awards on April 13. An extended trailer was released on April 28, and Fox released more clips via YouTube as part of the film's pre-release promotion. On April 2, the studio announced the launch of a promotional tour program named Demand Our Stars. Green, Woodley, Elgort, and Wolff would visit the states that got most votes from fans re-blogging their states' map outlines. Four states won: the tour program started in Miami, Florida, on May 6; went to Cleveland, Ohio, on May 7; then went to Nashville, Tennessee, on May 8; and ended in Dallas, Texas, on May 9.

Home media
The Fault in Our Stars was released on DVD and Blu-ray on September 16, 2014. The Fault in Our Stars: Little Infinities Blu-ray edition features the theatrical 126-minute and extended 133-minute versions of the film, a number of deleted scenes including the John Green cameo, and featurettes. The home video release grossed over $42.6million in total domestic video sales. It became available to stream on Disney+ on September 24, 2021.

Reception

Critical response
On review aggregator Rotten Tomatoes, the film has an approval rating of 81% based on 226 reviews, with an average rating of 6.90/10. The site's critical consensus reads, "Wise, funny, and heartbreaking without resorting to exploitation, The Fault in Our Stars does right by its bestselling source material." Metacritic gave the film a score of 69 out of 100, based on 45 critics, indicating "generally favorable reviews." Opening day audiences polled by CinemaScore gave the film an "A" on an A+ to F scale.

Steven Rea of The Philadelphia Inquirer gave the film a score of 3 out of 4; he said, "Woodley ... balances grace with gravity, wit with heart." A. O. Scott writing for The New York Times said, "The film sets out to make you weepnot just sniffle or choke up a little, but sob until your nose runs and your face turns blotchy. It succeeds." The Boston Globe's Ty Burr gave the film a rating of 2.5 out 4 and said, "If Elgort's Gus is glibly charming and ultimately affecting, The Fault in Our Stars belongs to Woodley, a performer who always seems to be backing warily into her own movies."

Quickflix's Simon Miraudo rated the film 3/5, and said, "The Fault in Our Stars undeniably sets us up to knock us down." Richard Roeper of Chicago Sun-Times gave the film 4 stars. He said Woodley's performance as Hazel was "transcendent, pure and authentic", stating that, "she's that memorable." Scott Mendelson of Forbes magazine said the film is "exceptionally high-quality mainstream entertainment" and called it "a genuine work of art." Anna Smith of Empire said it was a, "touching romance and Shailene Woodley's best performance yet." Emma Dibdin of Digital Spy wrote "The Fault in Our Stars is a sharp and emotionally-sophisticated weepie that imbues its teenage characters with rare intelligence, and tackles its bleak subject matter with acerbic wit and tenderness." Wilson Morales at BlackFilm.com praised Woodley and Elgort's performances, saying they "are so captivating and genuine in their performances, they manage to make this intensely poignant film very moving, romantic and highly entertaining."

Time magazine's Richard Corliss wrote, "Hazel and Augustus will live in film lore because of the young actors who play them." Chris Vongar of Dallas Morning News gave the film a B+ as "the movie is witty and alive and only very occasionally maudlin." USA Todays Claudia Puig called the film "well-written, well-acted, acerbic, funny and wisely observed", giving it 3.5 out of 4. Chris Nashawaty of Entertainment Weekly called the film a "funny, sweet, three-hankie tearjerker" and gave the B grade. Geoff Pevere of The Globe and Mail said, "While it may not conform to one's real-life expectations it certainly hews tightly to teen-flick conventions." Connie Ogle of The Miami Herald called it a, "sweet, romantic film full of sudden warmth and humor." A.A. Dowd of The A.V. Club gave the film a "B" saying that it is, "blessed with sparks of wit and buoyed by the talents of a charismatic cast."

Peter Bradshaw of The Guardian gave the film a negative review, likening it to "being mugged by a professional whose skills in mixed martial arts you can't help but notice and appreciate, even as you are savagely beaten, then dragged upright, bruised and bleeding, and forced to watch as your assailant gives fully 45% of your money to charity." Christy Lemire writing for Roger Ebert's website gave it two stars out of four and criticized the film for being "emotionally inert, despite its many moments that are meant to put a lump in our throats." Lemire criticized Elgort's performance and praised Woodley's "abiding, disarming naturalism." Robbie Collin writing for The Daily Telegraph said, "Gus is something of a manic pixie dreamboat: the lesser-spotted male version of the kooky, adoring girlfriend-type sometimes played by Kirsten Dunst, Natalie Portman, and Zooey Deschanel." David Edelstein of NPR said, I know people who cried at the trailer of the romantic teen cancer movie The Fault in Our Starsat the movie they'll need a life preserver to keep from drowning in a flood of tears. Me, I didn't cry, though at times my tear ducts tingled; I was on the verge. The film is a little slick for my taste, too engineered. But it's gently directed by Josh Boone and beautifully acted. Whatever the faults, it's not in the stars. Shalini Langer of The Indian Express gave the film two and a half stars and said, "The film is faithful to a fault from the dialogues to the clothes, the setting and the food, even while skipping over some of the unpleasant details." Dana Stevens writing for Slate Magazine said, "What in the name of God is wrong with me that I didn't cry onceI, who just the day before wept through the entirety of my child's thoroughly upbeat school play."

Two Christian reviewers and some theologians have mentioned the presence of Christian themes in the film. Writing for Catholic News Agency, Robert Barron said: I don't think it is the least bit accidental that Waters (Gus's last name) and Grace (Hazel's middle name) met in the sacred heart of Christ and thereby, despite their shared suffering, managed to give life to one another ... [and so] Hazel effectively repudiates her nihilism and materialism as she responds across the barrier of death to Gus's 'okay. He also noted, "[Is] this film a satisfying presentation of Christianity? Hardly. But for those who are struggling to find their way to meaning and faith, it's not an entirely bad place to start."

The film's studio, 20th Century Fox, mounted an unsuccessful campaign to have Shailene Woodley nominated for the Academy Award for Best Actress, as well as the film's adapted screenplay.

Box office
The Fault in Our Stars earned $124.9million in North America and $182.3million in other countries for a worldwide total of $307.2million, against a production budget of $12million.

In North America, the film's income received a boost from "The Night Before Our Stars," a premium-priced event for which tickets sold for up to $25. The event included a screening of the film and a simulcast question-and-answer session with cast and crew, including Woodley, Elgort, Wolff, and Green. The film earned $8.2million from Thursday-night showings and $26.1million on its opening day. During its opening weekend, the film earned $48,002,573 from 3,173 theaters at an average of $15,128 per theater, making it number one in North America.

At locations outside North America, The Fault in Our Stars earned $16.59million from 2,892 screens in 17 markets in its opening weekend, placing at number four behind Edge of Tomorrow ($81million), Maleficent ($61.7million), and X-Men: Days of Future Past ($41.1million). Brazil, Mexico, and Australia generated the highest income with $5.8million, $3.8million, and $3.7million respectively. The following week the film earned $16.1million from 40 markets, remaining at number 4 again.

Accolades

Remake and similar film

Dil Bechara

On August 6, 2014, India's Fox Star Studios announced its intention to remake the film. In March 2018, actor Sushant Singh Rajput was announced as the male lead in the official Hindi adaptation of the film. The film also marks the directorial debut of former casting director Mukesh Chhabra. Oscar winner A.R. Rahman composed its music. Actress Sanjana Sanghi was announced as the female lead. The movie was released on Disney+ Hotstar on July 24, 2020.

A Little Red Flower

The 2020 Chinese film A Little Red Flower has been noted for having significant similarities to The Fault in Our Stars, which was never theatrically released in China. The Hollywood Reporter reported on January 13, 2021, that Fox had attempted to create a Chinese remake to The Fault in Our Stars in 2016, with the former president of Fox International Productions, Tomas Jegeus, confirming that a remake was indeed in development at the studio with Yin Lu and Han Yan producing and Yu Yonggan writing the film's script.

Shortly after, two official film notices announced that the remake was in the works, but after the acquisition of 21st Century Fox by Disney, the studio decided to drop the film in 2018 to work on Dil Bechara. In 2018, a notice was released by the China Film Administration for a project titled Hopeless in Love, which would be produced by HG Entertainment and Lian Ray Pictures, with a premise similar to the original remake that had been in development. In 2020, A Little Red Flower was released from the same production companies, and with Yin Lu producing, Yu Yonggan co-writing, and Han Yan directing, but with no credit or mentions to Fox. However, Han said that many of the scenes portrayed in the story were inspired by real-life events that he witnessed himself. Both Disney, who acquired Fox, and A Little Red Flower's co-producer Lian Ray have declined to comment on the matter.

References

External links

 
 
 
 
 
 

 
20th Century Fox films
2010s coming-of-age drama films
2014 romantic drama films
2010s teen drama films
2010s teen romance films
2014 films
Albums produced by Dan Wilson (musician)
American coming-of-age drama films
American romantic drama films
American teen drama films
American teen romance films
Films about blind people
Films about cancer
Films about friendship
Films about death
Films based on American novels
Films based on romance novels
Films based on young adult literature
Films directed by Josh Boone
Films set in Amsterdam
Films set in Indianapolis
Films shot in Amsterdam
Films shot in Pittsburgh
Films based on works by John Green (author)
Films with screenplays by Scott Neustadter and Michael H. Weber
Temple Hill Entertainment films
TSG Entertainment films
Films about Anne Frank
Films set in Indiana
Films produced by Wyck Godfrey
2010s English-language films
2010s American films
Films about disability